Jim Wells (born March 21, 1955) is an American college baseball coach, formerly the head coach at Northwestern State and Alabama. Overall, in 18 seasons as a Division 1 head coach, he compiled a 714–335 record. In 18 seasons, he won five regular season conference titles, eight post-season conference championships, as well as 13 of 17 tournament appearances. Three of his teams advanced to the College World Series.

Wells guided the Crimson Tide to NCAA tournament appearances in 10 out of his 12 seasons there. His teams also won the SEC tournament six times. In 1996, and 2002, he won the SEC Coach of the Year awards.

On September 1, 2009, Wells officially announced his retirement as head coach of the Alabama Crimson Tide baseball program.  Wells retired after 15 seasons as head coach of the Crimson Tide, posting a 625–322 (.656) overall record during his tenure.  Alabama hired Mitch Gaspard to replace Wells.

Awards and honors
Three college world series appearances
Two SEC championships
Three SEC West Division Titles
Six SEC Tournament Championships
Four 50 win seasons, including 12 40 win seasons
Two time SEC coach of the year
1997 Baseball America Coach of the Year

Year-by-year record

External links
Official Bio @ RollTide.com

References

1955 births
Living people
Northwestern State Demons baseball coaches
Alabama Crimson Tide baseball coaches